The Niles Depot Museum is located in the former Southern Pacific Railroad colonnade-style passenger depot built in 1901, and freight depot, located in the Niles District of Fremont, California. The museum is operated by the Niles Depot Historical Foundation and features exhibits and artifacts about area railroads, including the early Southern Pacific Railroad and Western Pacific Railroad, as well as the current Union Pacific Railroad and Amtrak.

The museum is also constructing two model railways of Niles and surrounding areas, which are operated by the Tri-City Society of Model Engineers.

Southern Pacific station
Southern Pacific established rail service to Niles in 1870. The original station building was replaced with a larger depot in 1901. The second station was moved to become a private residence and replaced with the final passenger depot. Passenger service ended in 1941, though the building continued to be used as for freight.

The 1901-built station was restored in 1988 and moved again to Niles Plaza in 2009.

References

External links

Niles Depot Museum - official site

Culture of Fremont, California
Buildings and structures in Fremont, California
Transportation in Alameda County, California
Museums in Alameda County, California
Railroad museums in California
Model railway shows and exhibitions
Tourist attractions in Fremont, California
1982 establishments in California
Museums established in 1982
Infrastructure completed in 1901
Railway stations in the United States opened in 1901
Railway stations in Alameda County, California
Former Southern Pacific Railroad stations in California